This article gives an overview of Christian democracy in the Netherlands, which is also called confessionalism, including political Catholicism and Protestantism. It is limited to Christian democratic parties with substantial support, mainly proved by having had a representation in parliament. The sign ⇒ means a reference to another party in that scheme.

History

Christian democracy is the second oldest political ideology in the Netherlands, although before 1977 it was called "confessionalism" (politics based on the Christian confession).

Christian democracy in the Netherlands is separated by roughly two kinds of cleavages—religious cleavages and political cleavages—which sometimes coincide.

The strongest religious cleavage is between Catholicism and Protestantism. Before the 1920s Catholics were treated as second class citizens and they were strongly despised by Protestants, who combined their Dutch nationalism with fierce anti-papism. There also are strong cleavages within Protestantism, most notably between the Dutch Reformed Church (Hervormd) and the Reformed Churches in the Netherlands (Gereformeerd). There are also cleavages within the Reformed Churches. The religious cleavages were reinforced by pillarisation—self-imposed religious segregation.

Christian democratic parties were also divided on political matters. The left-right cleavage split left-wing, centrist and right-wing strands of Christian democracy within the movement.

Before the 1880s the dominant political division in the Netherlands was between liberalism and conservatism. Orthodox strands of Protestantism were allied with the conservatives, while political Catholicism was allied with liberalism.

Origins and party formation
One of the issues that led to the rise of Christian democracy in the Netherlands was the school struggle. Since the French period, public education in the Netherlands had been secular. After failed attempts to restore the Christian nature of public education, several Christian politicians such as Guillaume Groen van Prinsterer started promoting the establishment of private Christian schools. An 1878 act of parliament put higher demands on the quality of school buildings and the wages and education of teachers. These higher demands were accompanied by additional funding from the government for secular public schools, but not for Christian schools, many of which were unable to sustain the financial burden. This intensified the Christians' call for equal funding for Christian schools.

On 3 April 1879, the theologian Abraham Kuyper founded the Anti-Revolutionary Party (ARP), the first national political party in the Netherlands. It was accompanied by the formation of a separate orthodox Protestant pillar, social group, which involved a separate church, the Gereformeerde Reformed Churches in the Netherlands and a separate system of Protestant schools, including the Free University. This separate organisation was based on a particular interpretation of the separation between church and state, namely sphere sovereignty. It also advocated the extension of suffrage to all fathers of households.

Kuyper, who had taken over leadership of the school struggle after Groen van Prinsterer's death in 1876, advocated cooperation with the Catholics in order to form united opposition to the liberals, a concept known as the antithesis. The Catholics lacked a political organisation, but were informally led by Herman Schaepman, who had been the first priest elected to the States General of the Netherlands. They had a solid electoral base in the predominantly Catholic south and an organisation in the Catholic Church. They lacked a shared political position, but tended to favour the extension of suffrage and equal finance for Catholic schools. The Catholics had allied with the liberals in previous decades, but the school struggle, as well as the Quanta cura and the Syllabus of Errors of 1864, led Schaepman to move closer the Protestants instead.

In the 1880s the ARP's strategy became successful, both electorally, as it became an important political actor, and politically, as it was able to form an alliance, the Coalition, with the Catholics. In 1888 this resulted in the first cabinet comprising both Protestant and Catholic ministers, led by Æneas Mackay.

The Coalition returned to the opposition benches in 1891, and the new liberal government introduced a bill which would have effectively enfranchised nearly all male adults. This proposal split the Anti-Revolutionary Party in two groups. Kuyper, who intended for his party to represent kleine luyden, or "small folk", supported the bill. However, a number of Anti-Revolutionaries led by Alexander de Savornin Lohman were more reluctant to support extension of suffrage. Other issues also became the source of division between the two groups. Firstly, De Savornin Lohman's group rejected the party discipline which Kuyper had expected of his MPs, instead valuing the independence of representatives. Secondly, the group was still strongly anti-papist, and thus rejected Kuyper's antithesis. Thirdly, the group generally represented Protestants who had not joined Kuyper's Dolantie and remained Hervormd. De Savornin Lohman and his followers formed a separate parliamentary group after the 1894 general election, and founded the Free Anti-Revolutionary Party four years later. A series of mergers eventually led to the formation of the Christian Historical Union (CHU) in 1908.

After the Coalition won a majority in the 1901 general election, Kuyper came to lead a cabinet including ARP and Catholic ministers, while De Savornin Lohman's group stayed out of the government but provided confidence and supply support. Schaepman's vision of a united Catholic party became a reality on 15 October 1904, a year after his death, when local Catholic electoral caucuses united to form the national General League of Roman Catholic Caucuses. In 1913 a liberal cabinet was formed which sought to address all the major political issues of the time in the Pacification of 1917, which involved the extension of suffrage, the implementation of proportional representation, and equalisation of school finance. Although in opposition, the Catholics and Protestants participated in the reform talks.

Pillarisation and dominance
The extension of suffrage proved especially favourable for the religious parties. From the 1918 election onward, one or more of those parties was always part of the government. Between 1918 and 1939 the Catholics, CHU, and ARP always formed the governing coalition, sometimes joined by liberals. The policy of these cabinets was characterised by conservatism: in the social sense, by strengthening pillarisation and enforcing public morality; in the economic sense, by keeping income and expenditure on the same level, which proved detrimental in the Great Depression; and in foreign policy, by adhering to armed neutrality and maintaining colonialism. These cabinets were led in turn by the Catholic Charles Ruijs de Beerenbrouck, the Anti-Revolutionary Hendrikus Colijn and the CHU politician Dirk Jan de Geer.

The extension of suffrage also gave smaller Christian Democratic parties a chance to enter Parliament. A pair of left-wing Protestant parties entered Parliament, the Christian Democratic Party and Christian Social Party, as did a pair of anti-papist orthodox religious parties, the Political Reformed Party (which is still represented in Parliament) and the Reformed Reformed State Party. In both pairs the first is the Gereformeerd and the second is the Hervormd variant. A smaller left-wing Catholic party also gained representation, the Roman Catholic People's Party. In response the Catholics reformed their party to the more centralised Roman Catholic State Party.

Between 1940 and 1945 the Netherlands was occupied by Nazi Germany. Prominent Catholic and Protestant politicians were involved in resistance work, while their political leaders were in London, where they formed a national cabinet with the liberals and the socialists.

In 1945 the first cabinet was formed after the World War II. The Queen appointed an explicitly progressive cabinet composed of the KVP and the Labour Party (PvdA), a new party formed by the Social Democratic Workers' Party, the Free-thinking Democratic League, the left-wing Protestant CDU and several prominent Catholics. This started a series of Roman-Red cabinets formed by the KVP and PvdA, most of which were led by social democrat Willem Drees. The two main coalition partners, which gained around 30% of the vote were joined by smaller parties, including the CHU and the ARP, which gained only 10% of the vote. The cabinets were progressive and implemented a broad range of reforms—including the formation of a welfare state, a mixed economy, decolonisation of the Dutch East Indies, and joining NATO and the European Economic Community. Decolonisation, which the ARP and prominent KVP members opposed, led to a split within the KVP and resulted in the formation in 1948 of the short-lived Catholic National Party. A religious conflict within the Dutch Reformed Church in the same year split the ARP and the Reformed Political Alliance.

Decline and unification
In the 1960s the position of the religious parties weakened. In 1957 they swapped the PvdA for the conservative liberal People's Party for Freedom and Democracy (VVD). This led to internal dissent. More importantly however the religious parties were affected by the decline of pillarisation. Since the mid-1960s, the Christian democrats had lost the majority and needed to rely on the VVD. In 1968 a group of left-wing, labour-oriented Catholics broke away from the KVP to form the Political Party of Radicals, and in 1971 they were joined by prominent Protestants. It joined an alliance with the Labour Party and the progressive liberal Democrats 66 (D'66). This alliance was unsuccessful at gaining a majority however in the 1971 and 1972 elections and they were forced to form a tenuous coalition with the KVP and ARP.

Meanwhile, pressured by their declining popularity, the KVP, ARP and CHU formed a federation in 1973. They fought the 1977 elections under a single electoral list, the Christian Democratic Appeal (CDA), which became a unified party in 1980. The formation of this centre-right broad Christian democratic party led to splits: on the right flank by the anti-papist orthodox reformed (the Reformed Political Party) and on the left by radical evangelicals (the Evangelical People's Party). Between 1977 and 1994 the CDA was the largest partner in a coalition with either the conservative liberals (1977–81; 1982–89) or the social democrats (1981–82; 1989–94), and always with a CDA member as prime minister.

Ruud Lubbers, who served as prime minister from 1982 to 1984, personified the CDA's no-nonsense policies of welfare state reform and privatisation. In 1989 the two left-wing Christian parties merged with the Pacifist Socialist Party and the Communist Party of the Netherlands to form GroenLinks, a Green party without a strict Christian democratic profile.

In 1994 the CDA suffered a decisive electoral defeat. The party lost half its vote and was confined to opposition for the first time in its history. It was also the first time since 1918 that a Christian Democratic Party was not part of the government.  Over the next eight years, it took this period to renew its political program. Meanwhile, the orthodox Protestant RPF and the GPV merged to form the social-Christian Christian Union. In the 2002 elections, which were characterised by considerable insecurity, the CDA performed particularly well.  CDA leader Jan Peter Balkenende served as prime minister for eight years, first heading a right-wing cabinet with the populist Pim Fortuyn List and the People's Party for Freedom and Democracy, a centrist cabinet with the VVD and the Democrats 66 and since 2007 a centre-left cabinet with the Labour Party and the Christian Union.

The CDA was roundly defeated in the 2010 election, but managed to become junior partner in a government led by the VVD.

Timeline

ARP
 1879 The Anti-Revolutionary Party is founded by Abraham Kuyper.
 1894 The group around Alexander de Savorin Lohman left the ARP.
 1905 The ⇒CDP split from the ARP.
 1918 The ⇒ SGP split from the ARP.
 1926 The ⇒ CDU is formed by several groups, including former members of the ARP.
 1942 The ARP is forbidden by the German occupying force. Prominent members join the Dutch resistance.
 1948 The GPV splits from the ARP.
 1971 Several prominent Anti-Revolutionaries left the ARP for the ⇒PPR.
 1972 The Evangelical Progressive People's Party split from the ARP, in 1981 it would form the ⇒EVP.
 1974 The ARP joins the CDA federation together with the CHU and the KVP
 1975 The⇒ RPF splits from the ARP.
 1977 ARP candidates on a common list of the CDA in the 1977 elections.
 1980 The ARP merged into the ⇒CDA.

CHK
 1897 The Christian Historical Voters' League is formed.
 1903 The CHK merges with the ⇒VAR to form the ⇒CHP.

VAR
 1894 The group around Alexander de Savorin Lohman leaves the ARP.
 1898 This group formed the Free Anti Revolutionary Party.
 1903 The VAR merged with the ⇒CHK to form the ⇒CHP.

Frisian League
 1898 The Frisian League is formed.
 1908 The League merged with the ⇒CHP to form the ⇒CHU.

CHP
 1903 The Christian Historical Party is formed by the ⇒VAR and ⇒CHK.
 1907 The ⇒CSP splits from the CHP.
 1908 The CHP merged with the ⇒Frisian League to form the ⇒CHU.

General League
 1904 The General League of Roman Catholic Caucuses is formed by Catholic MPs.
 1922 The RKVP splits from the General League.
 1926 The General League is reformed and renamed to ⇒RKSP.

CDP
 1905 The Christian Democratic Party splits from the ⇒#ARP.
 1925 The CDP splits, some members join the ⇒ARP, others join the Social Democratic Workers' Party, and others remain independent and form the ⇒CDU with the ⇒CDP and former members of the ⇒#BCS in 1926.

BCS
1907 The League of Christian Socialists (Dutch: Bond Christen Socialisten; BCS) is founded.
1918 The BCS form a common parliamentary party with SDP and SP.
1919 The BCS splits, some members leave to join the Communist Party of the Netherlands, others join the Social Democratic Workers' Party and others remain independent and form the ⇒CDU with the ⇒CSP and former members of the ⇒CDP in 1926.

CSP
 1907 The Christian Social Party splits from the ⇒CHP.
 1926 The CSP joins former members of the ⇒BCS and the ⇒CDP to form the ⇒CDU.

CHU
 1908 The Christian Historical Union is formed by the ⇒Frisian League and the ⇒CHP.
 1921 The ⇒HGS splits from the CHU.
 1942 The CHU is forbidden by the German occupying force.
 1946 The Labour Party is founded several prominent CHU-members join the newly founded party.
 1974 The CHU joins the CDA federation together with the ARP and the KVP
 1977 CHU candidates on a common list of the CDA in the 1977 election.
 1980 The CHU merged into the ⇒CDA.

SGP
 1918 The Reformed Political Party split from the ⇒ARP
 1942 The SGP is forbidden by the German occupying force.
 1945 The SGP is founded again after the World War II.

HGS
 1921 The Reformed Reformed State Party split from the ⇒CHU
 1942 The HGS is forbidden by the German occupying force.

RKVP
 1922 The Roman Catholic People's Party split from the General League.
 1933 The RKVP merges with the Catholic Democratic League to form the Catholic Democratic Party.
 1937 The Catholic Democratic Party merges into the RKSP.

CDU
 1926 The Christian Democratic Union is formed by the ⇒CSP and former members of the ⇒ARP and the ⇒BCS and ⇒CDP.
 1942 The CDU is forbidden by the German occupying force.
 1946 The CHU joins the Social Democratic Workers' Party and the Free-thinking Democratic League to form the Labour Party.

RKSP
 1926 The ⇒General League is reformed and renamed to Roman Catholic State Party.
 1937 The Katholic Democratic Party merges into the RKSP.
 1942 The RKSP is forbidden by the German occupying force.
 1945 The RKSP is reformed and renamed to ⇒KVP.

GPV
 1948 The Reformed Political League splits from the ⇒ARP.
 2001 The GPV merges with the ⇒RPF to form the ⇒CU.

RPF
 1975 The Reformatory Political Federation splits from the ARP.
 2001 The RPF merges with the ⇒GPV to form the ⇒CU.

EVP
 1981 The Evangelical People's Party is formed by members of the Evangelical Progressive People's Party, which previously split from the ⇒ARP and members of the ⇒CDA, who also had a background in the ARP.
 1989 The EVP merges with the Communist Party of the Netherlands, the Pacifist Socialist Party and the ⇒PPR to form GroenLinks.

KVP
 1945 The ⇒RKSP is reformed and renamed to Catholic People's Party.
 1948 The ⇒KNP splits from the KVP.
 1955 The KNP merges into the KVP.
 1968 The ⇒PPR splits from the KVP.
 1974 The KVP joins the CDA federation together with the CHU and the ARP
 1977 KVP candidates on a common list of the CDA in the 1977 elections.
 1980 The KVP merged into the ⇒CDA.

KNP
 1948 The Catholic National Party split from the ⇒KVP
 1955 The KNP merges into the ⇒KVP

PPR
 1968 The Political Party of Radicals split from the ⇒KVP.
 1971 Several prominent Anti-Revolutionaries left the ⇒ARP for the PPR.
 1971 The PPR forms an electoral alliance with the Labour Party and the Pacifist Socialist Party.
 1972 The PPR forms an electoral alliance with the Labour Party and the Democrats 66.
 1981 The PPR official abandons its Christian-social course and alliance with the Labour Party and becomes a left-wing green party.
 1989 The PPR merges with the ⇒EVP, Pacifist Socialist Party and the Communist Party of the Netherlands to form GroenLinks.

RKPN
 1972 The Roman Catholic Party of the Netherlands is formed.
 1977 The RKPN is dissolved.

CDA
 1973 The Christian Democratic Appeal is formed as a federation of the ⇒KVP, the  ⇒CHU and the  ⇒ARP.
 1980 The member parties dissolve themselves to form the CDA.

Christian democratic leaders
ARP: Abraham Kuyper, Hendrikus Colijn
CHU: Alexander de Savorin Lohman, Dirk Jan de Geer
General League and RKSP: Herman Schaepman, Willem Hubert Nolens, Charles Ruijs de Beerenbrouck
SGP: Rev. Gerrit Hendrik Kersten (founder), Bas van der Vlies (1986-2010), Kees van der Staaij (current)
HGS: Rev. Casper Andries Lingbeek
KVP: Carl Romme, Norbert Schmelzer
PPR: Bas de Gaay Fortman
EVP: Cathy Ubels (MP 1982–1986)
CDA: Ruud Lubbers (1982-1994, PM), Jan Peter Balkenende (2001-2002; Prime Minister 2002–2010), Maxime Verhagen (informal leader of the CDA 2010–2012; Deputy Prime Minister and Minister of Agriculture and Economic Affairs 2010-), Jan Kees de Jager (Minister of Financial Affairs 2010- [previous State Secretary of Financial Affairs 2007-2010]),
Sybrand van Haersma Buma (Leader of the CDA 2012-)
CU: Andre Rouvoet (2002-2007, 2010–2011; Deputy Prime Minister 2007–2010), Arie Slob (2007-2010, 2011-)

See also
 History of the Netherlands
 Politics of the Netherlands
 List of political parties in the Netherlands
 Anarchism in the Netherlands
 Liberalism in the Netherlands
 Socialism in the Netherlands

References

Further reading
 
 

Political history of the Netherlands